Winisk Lake is a large, irregularly-shaped lake in the Unorganized Part of Kenora District in northwestern Ontario, Canada. It is on the Winisk River, and is part of the Hudson Bay drainage basin.

The primary inflows are the Winisk River at the northeast, the Wapitotem River at the south and the Fishbasket River at the southwest. The primary outflow is the Winisk River at the north, which flows to Hudson Bay.

The Webequie First Nation (also known as Webequie, Ontario) and its airport are located on Eastwood Island in the middle of the lake.

See also
List of lakes in Ontario

References

Lakes of Kenora District